Events in the year 1935 in India.

Incumbents
 Emperor of India – George V
 Viceroy of India – The Earl of Willingdon

Events
 National income - 25,298 million
 31 May – The 7.7  Quetta earthquake shook British India with a maximum Mercalli intensity of X (Extreme), killing 30,000–60,000.
 Dr. BR. Ambedkar ended all 3 temple entry movement in 1935.

Law
 2 August – Government of India Bill, became law; it provided for development of a popular constitution.

Births
2 January – Syed Jahangir, Bangladeshi painter (died 2018)
19 January – Soumitra Chatterjee, actor. (died 2020)
24 January – Shivabalayogi, Indian yogi (died 1994)
1 March – Ajoy Roy, Bangladeshi academic (died 2019)
5 March – Shamsuddin Qasemi, Bangladeshi Islamic scholar and politician (died 1996)
17 March – Muhammad Ashiq, Pakistani cyclist (died 2018)
7 April  S. P. Muthuraman, film director.
3 May – Sujatha, author, short story writer and playwright (died 2008).
25 May – Neela Ramgopal, Carnatic musician (died 2023)
7 June 
Thomas Kailath, Indian-American engineer, author, and educator
Shyama, actress (died 2017) 
21 June – Pratap Chauhan, cricketer
25 June – Udey Chand, wrestler and wrestling coach
2 July 
 Guruvayur Dorai, percussionist
 Amar Singh Sokhi, cyclist
10 July – P. K. Gurudasan, politician
18 July – Jayendra Saraswathi, Shankaracharya of Kanchi Kamakoti Peetham.
1 August – Mohinder Pratap Chand, writer and poet. (died 2020)
23 September – Prem Chopra, actor.
30 September – Shamsur Rahman Faruqi, poet and literary critic (died 2020)
13 November – P. Susheela, playback singer
24 November – Salim Khan, actor and scriptwriter.
8 December – Dharmendra, actor.
11 December – Pranab Mukherjee, politician and Minister. (died 2020)

Full date unknown
Khalish Dehlavi, poet.

References

 
India
Years of the 20th century in India